The 2012–13 season of the Belgian Second Division (also known as Belgacom League for sponsorship reasons) began on 22 August 2012 and ended in April 2013. The season was won by Oostende, who were thus promoted to the Belgian Pro League. Mouscron-Péruwelz, Westerlo and WS Woluwe played the second division final round but lost this to Cercle Brugge, resulting in no other team gaining promotion. At the bottom end of the table, Sint-Niklaas and Oudenaarde were relegated, while Heist were saved due to the bankruptcy of Beerschot AC.

Team changes
After promotion and relegation, only 13 teams of the previous season remained in the league, with 5 others being replaced:

Out
 Charleroi were promoted as champions of the previous season.
 Waasland-Beveren ended second, but won the second division final round and was therefore also promoted to the Pro League.
 Tienen ended 16th, but lost the third division playoffs and was subsequently relegated.
 Dender EH was relegated to the Third Division after finishing 17th.
 Wetteren was relegated to the Third Division after finishing 18th.

In
 Sint-Truiden was directly relegated from the Pro League.
 Westerlo lost the second division final round and as a result they were also relegated from the Pro League.
 Mouscron-Péruwelz promoted as champions from Third Division A.
 Dessel Sport promoted as champions from Third Division B.
 Oudenaarde was promoted after winning the third division playoffs.

Team information

Regular season

League table

Period winners
Like before, the season was divided into three periods. The first ten matchdays together form the first period, matchdays 11 to 22 form period two and the last 12 form period three. The three period winners take part in the Belgian Second Division Final Round together with the winner of the 2012–13 Belgian Pro League relegation playoff. The winner of this final round gets to play in the 2013–14 Belgian Pro League.

The first period was won by WS Woluwe and the second and third by Oostende. As Oostende won the title, Mouscron-Péruwelz and Westerlo were given the right to take part in the Final Round as the two highest finishing teams not yet entitled.

Period 1

Period 2

Period 3

Season statistics

Top scorers
Source: Belgcom League

10 goals (4 players)

  Ratko Vansimpsen (Dessel Sport)
  Christian Santos (Eupen)
  Joeri Dequevy (Sint-Truiden)
  Raphaël Lecomte (Visé)

9 goals (3 players)

  Baptiste Schmisser (Oostende)
  Ioannis Masmanidis (Visé)
  William Owusu (Westerlo)

8 goals (3 players)

  Dieter Van Tornhout (Antwerp)
  Alessandro Cerigioni (Lommel)
  Seïd Khiter (Mouscron-Péruwelz)

7 goals (6 players)

  Leandro Trossard (Lommel)
  Jérôme Mezine (Mouscron-Péruwelz)
  Benjamin Lutun (Roeselare)
  Marcel Mbayo (Sint-Niklaas)
  Nils Schouterden (Sint-Truiden)
  Kevin Vandenbergh (Westerlo)

6 goals (11 players)

  Michael Lallemand (Eupen)
  Bram Criel (Heist)
  Jeroen Vanderputte (Heist)
  Anthony Bova (Mouscron-Péruwelz)
  Benjamin Delacourt (Mouscron-Péruwelz)
  Dempsey Vervaecke (Oudenaarde)
  Sven De Rechter (Roeselare)
  Reza Ghoochannejhad (Sint-Truiden)
  Donny de Groot (Sint-Truiden)
  Philippe Liard (Tubize)
  Chris Makiese (Visé)

5 goals (17 players)

  Jonas Bogaerts (Aalst)
  Omar Benassar (Antwerp)
  Jordan Faucher (Antwerp)
  Maxime Lemoine (Borinage)
  Redouan Aalhoul (Brussels)
  Prince Asubonteng (Dessel Sport)
  Huseyin Bilican (Dessel Sport)
  Dieter Dekelver (Lommel)
  Mahamadou Dissa (Oostende)
  Xavier Luissint (Oostende)
  Wouter Moreels (Oostende)
  Alexandre Frutos (Oudenaarde)
  Junior Kabananga (Roeselare)
  Kurt Weuts (Sint-Niklaas)
  Gary Ambroise (Tubize)
  Oleg Iachtchouk (Westerlo)
  Julien Guérenne (WS Woluwe)

4 goals (22 players)

  Alexandre Di Gregorio (Aalst)
  Niels Martin (Aalst)
  Oumar Diouck (Antwerp)
  Olivier Bonnes (Brussels)
  Sébastien Siani (Brussels)
  Anthony Bassey (Eupen)
  Christian Kabasele (Eupen)
  Siegerd Degeling (Heist)
  Wouter Scheelen (Lommel)
  Marvin Turcan (Mouscron-Péruwelz)
  Jesse Martens (Oudenaarde)
  Sébastien Dewaest (Roeselare)
  Anthony Di Lallo (Roeselare)
  Bram Vandenbussche (Roeselare)
  Jonas Vandermarliere (Sint-Niklaas)
  Bruno Andrade (Sint-Truiden)
  Grégory Dufer (Sint-Truiden)
  Andrei (Tubize)
  Arnaud Biatour (Visé)
  Nick Van Belle (Westerlo)
  Chemcedine El Araichi (WS Woluwe)
  Patrick Amoah (WS Woluwe)

3 goals (25 players)

  Marijn Vandewalle (Aalst)
  Seppe Kil (Antwerp)
  Christophe Nahimana (Brussels)
  Zico Gielis (Dessel Sport)
  Hans Hannes (Dessel Sport)
  Dino Peljto (Dessel Sport)
  Thomas Stevens (Heist)
  Roy Meeus (Lommel)
  Michiel Jonckheere (Oostende)
  Jamaïque Vandamme (Oostende)
  Jan De Langhe (Oudenaarde)
  Tom Raes (Oudenaarde)
  Frederik Declercq (Roeselare)
  Romain Haghedooren (Roeselare)
  Daniel Ternest (Roeselare)
  Henri Munyaneza (Sint-Niklaas)
  Guy Dufour (Sint-Truiden)
  Emmanuel Françoise (Visé)
  Jens Cools (Westerlo)
  Kevin Geudens (Westerlo)
  Philippe Janssens (Westerlo)
  Trésor Diowo (WS Woluwe)
  Jonathan Heris (WS Woluwe)
  Yannick Loemba (WS Woluwe)
  Ivan Yagan (WS Woluwe)

2 goals (46 players)

  Tjendo De Cuyper (Aalst)
  Sander Van Eyk (Aalst)
  Predrag Filipović (Aalst)
  Bruno Carvalho (Antwerp)
  Freddy Mombongo-Dues (Antwerp)
  Joren Dom (Antwerp)
  Luke Giverin (Antwerp)
  Nicky Hayen (Antwerp)
  Rachid El Barkaoui (Borinage)
  Hicham El Morabit (Borinage)
  Alexandre Laurienté (Borinage)
  Samuel Robail (Borinage)
  Kingsley Umunegbu (Borinage)
  Mansour Diop (Brussels)
  Wouter Vosters (Dessel Sport)
  Samuel Asamoah (Eupen)
  Romeo Debefve (Eupen)
  Glenn Neven (Heist)
  Bart Goossens (Lommel)
  Thomas Jutten (Lommel)
  Egon Wisniowski (Lommel)
  Jugurtha Domrane (Mouscron-Péruwelz)
  Viktor Klonaridis (Mouscron-Péruwelz)
  Mickaël Seoudi (Mouscron-Péruwelz)
  Kevin Vandendriessche (Mouscron-Péruwelz)
  Niels De Schutter (Oostende)
  Mathias Schamp (Oudenaarde)
  Klaas Van Den Bossche (Oudenaarde)
  François Kompany (Sint-Niklaas)
  Abdelhakim Laref (Sint-Niklaas)
  Tail Schoonjans (Sint-Niklaas)
  Lode Vertonghen (Sint-Niklaas)
  Edmilson (Sint-Truiden)
  Sascha Kotysch (Sint-Truiden)
  Leopold Novak (Sint-Truiden)
  Lou Wallaert (Tubize)
  Gideon Boateng (Visé)
  Pierre-Alain Laloux (Visé)
  Daan De Pever (Visé)
  Matteo Prandelli (Visé)
  Redouane Zerzouri (Visé)
  Laurens Paulussen (Westerlo)
  Jonathan Wilmet (Westerlo)
  Denis Dessaer (WS Woluwe)
  Frédéric Farin (WS Woluwe)
  Jérémy Serwy (WS Woluwe)

1 goal (75 players)

  Sam De Munter (Aalst)
  Maxime Gunst (Aalst)
  Tom Pietermaat (Aalst)
  Ken Van Damme (Aalst)
  Conor Laerenbergh (Antwerp)
  David Vandenbroeck (Antwerp)
  Honour Gombami (Antwerp)
  Salomon Nirisarike (Antwerp)
  Gyliano van Velzen (Antwerp)
  Rachid Mourabit (Borinage)
  Geoffrey Cabeke (Brussels)
  Aliou Dia (Brussels)
  David Habarugira (Brussels)
  Kevin Tunani (Brussels)
  Francesco Carratta (Dessel Sport)
  Aleksandar Kolev (Dessel Sport)
  Jonas Nijs (Dessel Sport)
  Kurt Remen (Dessel Sport)
  Alassane Diallo (Eupen)
  Prisse Kenne (Eupen)
  Kevin Kis (Eupen)
  Luigi Vaccaro (Eupen)
  Jimmy Fockaert (Heist)
  Simon Vermeiren (Heist)
  Jentl Gaethofs (Lommel)
  Toon Lenaerts (Lommel)
  Ken van Mierlo (Lommel)
  Sébastien Alliotte (Mouscron-Péruwelz)
  Anice Badri (Mouscron-Péruwelz)
  Jérémy Huyghebaert (Mouscron-Péruwelz)
  Dimitri Mohamed (Mouscron-Péruwelz)
  Vincent Provoost (Mouscron-Péruwelz)
  Niels Coussement (Oostende)
  Guillaume Dequaire (Oostende)
  Gertjan Martens (Oostende)
  Ramzi Ben Ahmed (Oudenaarde)
  Viktor De Coker (Oudenaarde)
  Mathieu De Jonckheere (Oudenaarde)
  Dieter De Wilde (Oudenaarde)
  Ludwin Van Nieuwenhuyze (Oudenaarde)
  Arne Naudts (Oudenaarde)
  Abdelhakim Bouhna (Roeselare)
  Yannick Euvrard (Roeselare)
  Papa Sène (Roeselare)
  Masis Voskanyan (Roeselare)
  Prince Bobby (Sint-Niklaas)
  Steve Dessart (Sint-Niklaas)
  Tosin Dosunmu (Sint-Niklaas)
  Gertjan Martens (Sint-Niklaas)
  Enzo Neve (Sint-Niklaas)
  Steven Schurmann (Sint-Niklaas)
  Souleymane Youla (Sint-Niklaas)
  Guillermo Méndez (Sint-Truiden)
  Mario Pruna (Sint-Truiden)
  Ivo Rossen (Sint-Truiden)
  Mathias Schils (Sint-Truiden)
  Pierre-Yves Ngawa (Sint-Truiden)
  Yadin Zaris (Sint-Truiden)
  Samba Diawara (Tubize)
  Noë Dussenne (Tubize)
  Shean Garlito (Tubize)
  Laurent Kwembeke (Tubize)
  Sami Lkoutbi (Tubize)
  Jimmy Mulisa (Tubize)
  Jeremy Steens (Tubize)
  Norman Sylla (Tubize)
  Manuel Angiulli (Visé)
  Kader Camara (Visé)
  Jeffrey Rentmeister (Visé)
  Harlem Gnohéré (Westerlo)
  Stijn Minne (Westerlo)
  Kenneth Schuermans (Westerlo)
  Jeroen Vanthournout (Westerlo)
  Lanfia Camara (WS Woluwe)
  Sylvain Macé (WS Woluwe)

2 Own goals (1 player)

  Tom Raes (Oudenaarde, scored for Heist and Roeselare)

1 Own goal (11 players)

  Jonas Nijs (Dessel Sport, scored for Visé)
  Christophe Delande (Lommel, scored for Westerlo)
  Hans Vanaken (Lommel, scored for Heist)
  Dieter De Wilde (Oudenaarde, scored for Eupen)
  Elhadji Ndoye (Sint-Truiden, scored for Brussels)
  Pierre-Yves Ngawa (Sint-Truiden, scored for Tubize)
  Samba Diawara (Tubize, scored for Visé)
  Kader Camara (Visé, scored for Sint-Truiden)
  Aka Kevin Etien (Visé, scored for Heist)
  Marco Villagatti (Visé, scored for Antwerp)
  Kenneth Schuermans (Westerlo, scored for Sint-Niklaas)

References

Belgian Second Division seasons
2012–13 in Belgian football
Belgian